Julian Anthony Howard (born 3 April 1989 in Mannheim) is a German athlete specialising in the long jump. He finished fifth at the 2017 European Indoor Championships.

His personal bests in the event are 8.07 metres outdoors (+0.5 m/s, Wesel 2013) and 8.04 metres indoors (Karlsruhe 2015).

His mother comes from Jamaica.

International competitions

References

1989 births
Living people
German male long jumpers
Sportspeople from Mannheim
German people of Jamaican descent
Competitors at the 2013 Summer Universiade
Competitors at the 2017 Summer Universiade